Tito Jermaine Paul (born May 24, 1972) is a former American football cornerback in the National Football League for the Arizona Cardinals, Cincinnati Bengals, Denver Broncos, and the Washington Redskins. With the Broncos, he won Super Bowl XXXIII over the Atlanta Falcons. He played college football at Ohio State University and was drafted in the fifth round of the 1995 NFL Draft.

Paul is an insurance agent in Delaware, Ohio.

References

1972 births
Living people
American football cornerbacks
Arizona Cardinals players
Cincinnati Bengals players
Denver Broncos players
Ohio State Buckeyes football players
People from Kissimmee, Florida
Players of American football from Florida
Sportspeople from Greater Orlando
Washington Redskins players